R v Sullivan [1984] AC 156 is a British House of Lords case in criminal law, and a leading modern authority on the common law defence of insanity.

Facts 
The defendant, who had had epilepsy since childhood, kicked the victim, his friend, during an epileptic seizure while he was sitting in his neighbour's flat on 8 May 1981. Upon recovery, the defendant only remembered the incident where he was standing by a window with the victim lying on the floor with head injuries. The defendant was charged with assault. The trial judge ruled that the evidence that the defendant had had a post-epileptic seizure would amount to a disease of the mind, not that of automatism.

Judgment 
The House of Lords held that epilepsy was a disease of the mind due to the defendant's impaired mental faculties causing defect in reasoning. Lord Diplock stated that

See also 
 Insanity defense
 M'Naghten rules

References 

Criminal defenses
House of Lords cases
Insanity-related case law
S
1984 in British law
1984 in case law